The Dam Cup is an American college football rivalry in the Pacific Northwest between the Eastern Washington Eagles and the Portland State Vikings. Both are members of the Big Sky Conference in the Football Championship Subdivision of NCAA Division I.

The Dam Cup began  in 2010 as a multi-sport competition between the two schools. It refers to the Columbia River watershed and its dams in a double entendre. The EWU campus  is upstream in Cheney, southwest of Spokane, while Portland is the major city on the river.

The football teams first played  in 1968 and have been conference rivals in the Big Sky since Portland State joined in 1996.

Game results

 Only tie was in 1988; the Big Sky enacted overtime for conference games in 1980,and all Division I games went to overtime in 1996.

See also  
 List of NCAA college football rivalry games

References

College football rivalries in the United States
Eastern Washington Eagles football
Portland State Vikings football
Big Sky Conference rivalries